Mantic Games is a British miniatures and board game publisher, based in Bulwell, Nottingham, UK.

History

Mantic Games was started in 2008 by former Games Workshop Managing Director, Ronnie Renton with a range of high-fantasy miniatures that were compatible with other popular wargames, including Warhammer Fantasy Battles.

It later began publishing board games and miniature games, notable titles include Kings of War, Dwarf King's Hold, Dungeon Saga, Dreadball, Deadzone, Project Pandora, Warpath and Loka. It has also produced the licensed-game Mars Attacks—based on the Topps card game series and the Deadzone rules. Other licenses include The Walking Dead by Skybound Entertainment, where Mantic have produced The Walking Dead: All Out War table top game. And most recently Mantic have acquired the licence for the comic book characters from the Hellboy series, published by Dark Horse Comics. Hellboy: The Board Game was launched on Kickstarter in April 2018.

So far, Mantic has used former Games Workshop designers Alessio Cavatore (Warhammer 40,000, The Lord of the Rings Strategy Battle Game, Bolt Action (game)) and Jake Thornton (Inquistor, Lost Patrol, White Dwarf) to develop many of its games. Later versions of Warpath are developed in house by the Mantic design studio. Most recently James M. Hewitt from Needy Cat Games - another former Games Workshop designer - has become involved with Mantic Games to write Hellboy: The Board Game.

Kickstarter activity

Mantic has used Kickstarter to fund a number of its games and expansions, making over $8.3 million to date.

References

External links
 

Companies based in Nottinghamshire
Gaming miniatures companies
Board game publishing companies
Internet properties established in 2008